Xihuayuan Subdistrict is a subdistrict in Xixia District, Yinchuan, Ningxia, China. , it has 13 residential communities under its administration.

See also 
 List of township-level divisions of Ningxia

References 

Township-level divisions of Ningxia
Yinchuan